The Deputy Minister of Works (Malay: Timbalan Menteri Kerja Raya; ; Tamil: பணிகள் துணை அமைச்சர் ) is a Malaysian cabinet position serving as deputy head of the Ministry of Works.

List of Deputy Ministers of Works
The following individuals have been appointed as Deputy Minister of Works, or any of its earlier names:

Colour key (for political coalition/parties):

See also 
 Minister of Works (Malaysia)

References 

Ministry of Works (Malaysia)